Teuchocnemis bacuntius , (Walker, 1849), the  Orange Spur Fly , is a rare species of syrphid fly observed in eastern half of the United States. Syrphid flies are also known as Hover Flies or Flower Flies because the adults are frequently found hovering around flowers from which they feed on nectar and pollen. The larvae are unknown.

Distribution
United States.

References

Eristalinae
Insects described in 1849
Taxa named by Francis Walker (entomologist)
Diptera of North America
Hoverflies of North America